Black Earth Farming was a public, investment-run agriculture business based in Russia, operating as LLC Managing Company AGRO-Invest. Their business goal has been described as the acquisition of "cheap, neglected, but fertile land in the fertile Black Earth regions of Russia" by CEO Richard Warburton. It is sometimes described as a land grab company.

They had a contract with PepsiCo, growing sugar beets and potatoes for them. Other crops include winter wheat, oilseeds, and a variety of other grains.

The company raised its initial funding from the family backed Swedish investment companies Vostok Nafta and Kinnevik who remain major shareholders.

The company sold all its assets and entered voluntary liquidation in 2019.

References

External links

Agriculture companies of Russia